Terry Peter Chambers (born 18 July 1955) is an English drummer who was a member of the band XTC from 1972 to 1982 and the popular Australian-New Zealand group Dragon between 1983-5. He appears on all of XTC's albums between White Music (1978) and Mummer (1983).

Biography
Chambers was born in Swindon, Wiltshire. He originally wanted to learn to play the piano, but his parents could not afford to buy one. So instead he saved money from his Saturday job, stacking shelves at the local grocers, and at the age of 14 bought his first drum kit.

Chambers played on XTC's 3D - EP, White Music, Go 2, Drums and Wires, Black Sea, English Settlement, and many live recordings, until his departure from the band during the 1982 sessions for Mummer. On Mummer he played on "Beating of Hearts", "Wonderland" and the B-side "Toys". Chambers' reasons for leaving the band included the band's decision to stop touring and performing live, as well his own plans with his Australian girlfriend, with whom he subsequently migrated to New South Wales.

He became involved in session drumming while living in Australia as well as recording and touring with Dragon between late 1983 and mid 1985. He was featured on the studio album Body and the Beat (1984) and the live album and home video Live One (1985). He is also featured in the promotional video clips for the songs "Wilderworld", "Cry", "Magic" and "Rain".

Chambers divorced Donna Blanchard in 2016. They have one son, Kai Chambers, and two daughters, Corie and Abbi-Lee. Kai has followed in his father's footsteps, and has played in Australia and around the world as the drummer for October Rage.

Chambers returned to the UK in 2016 after meeting his old girlfriend Lynn Farrar. He recorded an EP with fellow ex-XTC member Colin Moulding, called Great Aspirations by TC&I, which was released in October 2017. Chambers formed EXTC with former TC&I bandmate Steve Tilling, performing classic XTC songs from the late 1970s and early 1980s.

EXTC - XTC's Terry Chambers and Friends are currently touring, alongside Terry, EXTC features frontman Steve Hampton (lead vocal & guitar - Joe Jackson & The Vapors) and Matt Hughes (bass & vocals - Rick Wakeman and Robyn Hitchcock).

References

External links
 Terry Chambers Interview with Todd Bernhardt Chalkhills March, 2002
 The Departure of Terry Chambers - Limelight Issue Three, Spring 1983
 XTC Go 3 - International Musician and Recording World, August, 1983
 Senses Working Overtime Modern Drummer Interview 2002
 In Loving Memory Of A Name - Limelight Issue #4 1984
 EXTC - XTC's Terry Chambers and Friends, 2022

1955 births
Living people
Dragon (band)
English rock drummers
People from Swindon
XTC members
Musicians from Wiltshire